Kanmanoor is a village in Addakal  Mandal, Mahbubnagar district, Telangana State.

References 

Villages in Mahbubnagar district